The PR1 women's single sculls competition at the 2022 World Rowing Championships took place at the Račice regatta venue.

Schedule
The schedule was as follows:

All times are Central European Summer Time (UTC+2)

Results

Heats
The fastest boats in each heat advanced directly to Final A. The remaining boats were sent to the repechages.

Heat 1

Heat 2

Repechage
The four fastest boats in repechage advanced to the Final A. The remaining boats were relegated.

Finals
The final determined the rankings.

Final A

References

2022 World Rowing Championships